Andrew James Clutterbuck (born 14 September 1973), known professionally as Andrew Lincoln, is an English actor. His first major role was as the character Egg in the BBC drama This Life (1996–1997). Lincoln later portrayed Simon Casey in the Channel 4 sitcom Teachers (2001–2003), Mark in the Christmas-themed romantic comedy film Love Actually (2003) and Dr. Robert Bridge in the ITV television series Afterlife (2005–2006).

Beginning in 2010, Lincoln gained recognition for his portrayal of Rick Grimes, the lead character on the AMC post-apocalyptic horror television series The Walking Dead. For his portrayal of Rick Grimes, Lincoln won the Saturn Award for Best Actor on Television in 2015 and 2017. He departed the cast of The Walking Dead in 2018, but reprised his role as Rick in 2022 as a cameo appearance in the series finale. He is also set to appear as Rick Grimes in an upcoming spinoff of The Walking Dead television series that is set to be released in 2024.

Early life 
Lincoln was born on 14 September 1973 in London, the son of an English civil engineer and a South African nurse. His family moved to Hull when he was 18 months old, and then to Bath, Somerset when he was eight or nine. He attended Beechen Cliff School, where at age 14 he had his first acting role as The Artful Dodger in a school production of Oliver!. He named John Scrine and Tony Lawdham as two teachers that encouraged him the most. After leaving school, he studied at the Royal Academy of Dramatic Art (RADA) drama school and began to use "Andrew Lincoln" as his stage name.

Career 
In 1994, Lincoln made his TV debut in "Births and Deaths", an episode of the Channel 4 sitcom Drop the Dead Donkey. In 1995, soon after finishing drama school, he was cast in his first major role playing Edgar "Egg" Cook, one of the lead characters in the BBC drama This Life. He went on to star in British television series and dramas such as The Woman in White, The Canterbury Tales, and Wuthering Heights, including probationary teacher Simon Casey in the Channel 4 sitcom Teachers. He also had a lead role as university lecturer and psychologist Robert Bridge in Afterlife, and starred in the Sky 1 series Strike Back with Richard Armitage in 2010. Lincoln appeared in several films such as Human Traffic and Gangster No. 1 and starred alongside Vanessa Paradis in Pascal Chaumeil's Heartbreaker. In particular, his role as Mark in the 2003 film Love Actually gained him wider recognition.

Lincoln has performed in plays, including Hushabye Mountain in 1999, Blue/Orange in 2000 and 2001, The Late Henry Moss in 2006, the Parlour Song in 2009, as well as radio productions. He has done voice-overs for documentaries, advertisements, and government campaigns. He directed two episodes in the third series of Teachers for which he received a BAFTA nomination for Best New Director (Fiction) in 2004.

In April 2010, Lincoln was cast as Rick Grimes, the protagonist of AMC's post-apocalyptic series The Walking Dead. Grimes is a sheriff's deputy who awakens from a coma in the midst of a zombie apocalypse. He becomes the leader of a group of family and friends who are forced to relentlessly fight off flesh-eating zombies and hostile humans. In 2010, Lincoln signed up for the show for a potential six years and renegotiated a deal for two further seasons. Lincoln appeared on the show for the final time on 4 November 2018, having previously stated that he wished to spend more time with his children. According to The New York Times, Lincoln's role on The Walking Dead made him "the center of one of the world's biggest pop culture franchises". Following Lincoln's departure from The Walking Dead, it was planned that he would reprise his role of Rick Grimes in a trilogy of feature-length films. Due to the ongoing COVID-19 pandemic, the films were delayed. They were subsequently replaced with 6-hour shows starring both Lincoln and Danai Gurira.

Lincoln has received various awards and nominations for his portrayal of Rick Grimes; he won the Saturn Award for Best Actor on Television in 2015 and again in 2017. In 2012 and 2015, TVLine spotlighted Lincoln as "Performer of the Week" for his performance in the fourth episode of season 3 ("Killer Within") and for the fifteenth episode of season 5 ("Try"), respectively. Regarding Lincoln's performance on "Try", TVLine said that he "could act his way from A to Z all within the span of a single hour". Jacob Stolworthy of The Independent said that Lincoln's performance in the first episode of season seven is "a moment where Andrew Lincoln excels, his character coming full circle".

In 2019, Lincoln was cast in and filmed his first non-The Walking Dead role since 2010 in the drama Penguin Bloom.

Personal life 
On 10 June 2006, Lincoln married Gael Anderson, daughter of Ian Anderson, flautist and vocalist of Jethro Tull. They have two children, Matilda (born 2007) and Arthur (born 2010).

He was educated in Bath, where he was childhood friends with former Exeter City manager Paul Tisdale. In 2017, Lincoln said "One of my oldest and dearest friends happens to be Paul Tisdale. So I've been watching him very avidly throughout his whole career and I've been very proud of him."

Politics
Lincoln has appeared in a video in support of the Robin Hood tax in 2014. Along with others involved in the video he has encouraged the public to get behind the measure, noting its "incredible support from people across Europe."

Filmography

Film

Television

Theatre

Awards and nominations

References

External links 

 
 

1973 births
Living people
Male actors from Kingston upon Hull
People educated at Beechen Cliff School
Alumni of RADA
English male film actors
English male television actors
English television directors
English male voice actors
English male stage actors
English people of South African descent
English expatriates in the United States
20th-century English male actors
21st-century English male actors
British male film actors
British male television actors
British television directors
British male voice actors
British male stage actors
British expatriates in the United States
20th-century British male actors
21st-century British male actors
People from Bath, Somerset
Male actors from London
National Youth Theatre members